Lorna Woodroffe (born 18 August 1976) is an English former tennis player.

She competed in the 2000 Summer Olympics in Sydney, Australia. Playing with Julie Pullin, she lost her first-round match in the women's doubles to Kristie Boogert and Miriam Oremans of the Netherlands, in two sets.

WTA career finals

Doubles: 1 (runner-up)

ITF finals

Singles (1–6)

Doubles (28–23)

Post-retirement life
After retiring from professional tennis, Woodroffe was one of the founders of WimX Tennis, a tennis academy and coaching business. As of 2021, she is still coaching there.

References

External links
 
 

Living people
British female tennis players
Tennis players at the 2000 Summer Olympics
Olympic tennis players of Great Britain
1976 births
English female tennis players
Tennis people from Surrey